The Central District of Kavar County is a district (bakhsh) in Kavar County, Fars Province, Iran. At the 2006 census, its population was 72,423, in 15,570 families.  The District has one city: Kavar. The District has three rural districts (dehestan): Farmeshkhan Rural District, Kavar Rural District, and Tasuj Rural District.

References 

Kavar County
Districts of Fars Province